Little Sisters of the Poor Home for the Aged may refer to:

Little Sisters of the Poor Home for the Aged (Minneapolis, Minnesota), listed on the National Register of Historic Places (NRHP)
Little Sisters of the Poor Home for the Aged (Nashville, Tennessee), listed on the NRHP in Nashville, Tennessee
St. Sophia Home of the Little Sisters of the Poor, Richmond, Virginia, listed on the NRHP in Richmond, Virginia
Home for the Aged Men and Women (Washington, DC)
House of Hermanitas de los Pobres (House of the Little Sisters of the Poor), Madrid, Spain

See also
 Little Sisters of the Poor Saints Peter and Paul Home v. Pennsylvania
 Little Sisters of the Poor